Act of Valor is a 2012 American action film produced and directed by Mike McCoy and Scott Waugh, and written by Kurt Johnstad. Starring Alex Veadov, Roselyn Sánchez, Nestor Serrano and Emilio Rivera, as well as active duty U.S. Navy SEALs and U.S. Navy Special Warfare Combatant-craft Crewmen, the film was released by Relativity Media on February 24, 2012.

The film opened to negative reviews from critics, but was well-received by audiences, grossing $81 million worldwide and being nominated at the 70th Golden Globe Awards for Best Original Song.

Plot
In Manila a terrorist assassinates the United States Ambassador to the Philippines, and also kills his son and dozens of children at an international primary school, using an ice cream truck to lure the children then detonating. The mastermind, a Chechen terrorist, Abu Shabal, escapes to a training camp in Indonesia. Elsewhere in Costa Rica, two CIA officers, Walter Ross and Lisa Morales, meet to consolidate intelligence about their target, a drug smuggler named Mikhail "Christo" Troykovich. Christo's men kill Ross and capture Morales, who is imprisoned in a jungle compound and tortured.

At Coronado, the members of Bandito Platoon, SEAL Team 7 are at home. Lieutenant Rorke confides to Chief Dave that his wife is pregnant and has the entire team spend time together with their families until their next deployment. A squad from the platoon consisting of Rorke, Dave, Wiemy, Mikey, Ray, Sonny, and Ajay, is then deployed to Costa Rica to exfiltrate Morales.

The seven Navy SEALs insert into the jungle via HALO and hold position outside the compound all night. At dawn, they approach the compound and engage several enemy guards.  Mikey is shot in the head, blinding him in one eye, and knocking him unconscious, though he survives. The SEALs extract Morales, escaping with her and recovering a cellphone full of the information she had gathered. However, the gunfight alerts the enemy quick reaction force. The SEALs commandeer an enemy truck and exfiltrate. The hot pursuit forces them to revert to a tertiary extraction point where two SWCC boats extract the team and neutralize the enemy pursuit with miniguns.

Christo and Shabal, who are revealed to have been childhood friends, meet in Kyiv. Christo knows the CIA is watching him and informs Shabal that subordinates will complete their project, which is to equip suicide bombers with specialized undetectable explosive vests.

On the amphibious assault ship USS Bonhomme Richard, Rorke is informed that the intelligence recovered confirms Shabal and Christo were working together. Shabal, an old-school Islamic terrorist, seeks to bring jihad to the U.S., while Christo provides the routes for smuggling drugs and people into the U.S. Ajay and Ray are sent to Somalia, where an arms transfer involving Shabal is taking place. The remaining SEALs, comprising Rorke, Dave, Sonny and Weimy, stay in the U.S. in case the terrorists make it in. Miller himself has been reassigned to SEAL Team Four, hunting for Christo somewhere on the oceans. Lieutenant Rorke gives Dave a letter to give to his family in case he is killed.

Shabal and sixteen terrorists are found to be on an island off Baja California, where the SEALs act to secure the island, killing eight terrorists. Shabal and eight others escape. Elsewhere, in the South Pacific, SEAL Team Four captures Christo and interrogate him, learning that Shabal's plot is to create panic and economic disruption to outdo the September 11 attacks.

The SEALs are informed that Shabal is en route to the U.S. via tunnels underneath a milk factory, and are ordered to link up with Mexican Special Forces and neutralize the remaining targets. Arriving at the factory, the SEALs and Mexican forces launch an assault there, engaging numerous Mexican cartel and Shabal's terrorists in the process. During the gunfight, a combatant throws a grenade, and Rorke sacrifices himself by diving on it to save his team before it detonates, killing him. Dave pursues the terrorists and shoots them as they try to escape through the tunnels. He is then shot several times and gravely wounded by Shabal, who is intercepted and killed by Sonny before he could execute Dave.

At home, Rorke is given a military funeral with full honors, where the SEALs pay their respects. It is then revealed that Dave's narration throughout the movie was a written letter meant for Rorke's son. The film ends with a dedication to 60 U.S. Navy SEAL and Special Warfare Combatant-craft Crewmen (SWCC) killed in action since 9/11 along with a listing of their names as well as a photo montage of fallen public servants.

Cast
 Jason Cottle as Yuri / Mohammad Abu Shabal, a Chechen terrorist 
 Derrick Van Orden as Senior Chief Otto Miller
 Rorke Denver as Lieutenant Rorke James Engel, field commander of SEAL Team 7
 Dave Hansen as Chief Dave Nolan, a Chief of SEAL Team 7
 Sonny Manson as Sonny, a member of SEAL Team 7
 Brendan “Weimy” Weimholt as 'Weimy', a member of SEAL Team 7
 Ajay "A.J." James as Ajay, a member of SEAL Team 7
 Ray Mendoza as Ray, a member of SEAL Team 7
 Douglas “Mike” Day as Mikey, a member of SEAL Team 7
 Katelyn Lyons as Lieutenant Lyons, a US Navy officer (the real character serves in the U.S. Army)
 William "Bill" Austin as SWCC Boat Senior Chief Billy
 Duncan Smith as Captain Duncan Smith
 Callaghan as Admiral Callaghan (the true character name is Rear Admiral Dennis Moynihan)
 Alex Veadov as Mikhail 'Christo' Troykovich, a drug smuggler working with Shabal
 Roselyn Sánchez as CIA officer Lisa Morales 
 Nestor Serrano as CIA officer Walter Ross
 Emilio Rivera as Sanchez, a head cartel thug
 Ernie Reyes Jr. as Recruit, a Filipino jihadist suicide bomber recruited by Shabal to launch terrorist attacks over the States
 Drea Castro as Recruit, a Filipino jihadist suicide bomber recruited by Shabal to launch terrorist attacks over the States
 Marissa Labog as Recruit, a Filipino jihadist suicide bomber recruited by Shabal to launch terrorist attacks over the States
 Keo Woolford as Recruit, a Filipino jihadist suicide bomber recruited by Shabal to launch terrorist attacks over the States
 Thomas Rosales, Jr. as Christo's RHM
 Antoni Corone as yacht henchman
 Gonzalo Menendez as Commander Pedros, a Mexican Special Forces commander who teams up with the SEAL Team to take down Shabal
 Ailsa Marshall as Jackie Engel, Lieutenant Engel's wife

Production

Development
In 2007, Mike McCoy and Scott Waugh of Bandito Brothers Production filmed a promotional ad video for the Special Boat Teams which led the U.S. Navy to allow them to use actual active duty SEALs and Special Boat Team members. After spending so much time working closely with the SEALs and SWCC, McCoy and Waugh conceived the idea for a modern-day action movie about this covert and elite fighting force. As Act of Valor developed with the SEALs on board as advisors, the filmmakers realized that no actors could realistically portray or physically fill the roles they had written and the actual SEALs and SWCC were drafted to star in the film. The SEALs and Special Boat Team members would remain anonymous, as none of their names appear in the film's credits. Legendary Pictures' founder and then-chairman/CEO Thomas Tull serves as executive producer.

For the Navy, the film is an initiative to recruit SEALs and SWCC. According to The Huffington Post, the Navy required the active-duty SEALs to participate.

Following a bidding war with Dark Castle Entertainment, Alcon Entertainment (both companies had their own respective distribution deals with Legendary's then-partner Warner Bros.), Lionsgate, and FilmDistrict, Relativity Media acquired the rights to the project on June 12, 2011 for $13 million and a $30 million in prints and advertising commitment. Deadline Hollywood called it "the biggest money paid for a finished film with an unknown cast". The production budget was estimated to be between $15 million and $18 million.

Principal photography

Filming took place in Cambodia where an explosion was shot in Phnom Penh with 300 children as extras. Scenes were shot in San Diego at Blue Foot Bar and in a house in the North Park area. Other locations included Mexico, Puerto Rico, Ukraine,  Florida, and at the John C. Stennis Space Center in Mississippi.

The crew filmed at Navy training sites to provide realistic settings, such as a drug cartel base, a terrorist camp on an isolated island, and a smuggler's yacht.
 
Cinematographer Shane Hurlbut used Canon EOS 5D Mark II cameras with Zeiss ZE and Panavision Primo lenses.  The cameras followed the SEALs' planned out missions in the film. Hurlbut used an 18mm Zeiss ZE  mounted on the SEALs' helmets to capture their point of view. The 25mm Zeiss ZE was used to capture natural light coming through windows. The 21mm Zeiss ZE was used as a stake cam so a truck could drive over it. The Navy held final cut privileges in order to remove any frames to address security concerns and kept raw footage to use for real-life training and other purposes.

Release
Act of Valor was scheduled to be released on February 17, 2012 in the U.S. to coincide with Presidents' Day, but was pushed back to February 24, 2012. The film was released in the UK and Ireland on March 23 as Act of Valour by Momentum Pictures.

Home video releases
Act of Valor was released on Blu-ray Disc and DVD on June 5, 2012 with a rating of R.

Accolades
The film was a 2012 Teen Choice Awards nominee for Choice Action Movie.

Reception
On Rotten Tomatoes the film has an approval rating of 28% based on 144 reviews with an average rating of 4.54/10. The site's critical consensus reads, "It's undeniably reverent of the real-life heroes in its cast, but Act of Valor lets them down with a clichéd script, stilted acting, and a jingoistic attitude that ignores the complexities of war." Metacritic assigned the film an average score of 40 out of 100, based on 34 critics, indicating "mixed or average reviews". 
Audiences on CinemaScore gave the film an average grade of "A", on an A+ to F scale.

The film opened at #1 at the box office, earning $24.5 million in its opening weekend from 3,039 theaters for an average of $8,054 per theater.

Many reviews, both positive and negative, expressed praise for the action sequences while criticizing the plot and acting. Claudia Puig from USA Today, for example, said the action in the film is "breathtaking," but gave the film an overall negative review, in which she wrote that "the soldiers' awkward line readings are glaring enough to distract from the potency of the story." Similarly, Amy Biancolli from the San Francisco Chronicle wrote, "Act of Valor is intended to wow audiences with high-test action while planting a giant wet kiss on the smacker of the U.S. military – and it scores at both tasks," but that, ultimately, "the film gets snagged by its own narrative convention." Michael Rechtshaffen from The Hollywood Reporter had a similar opinion, stating, "Although the film has its undeniably immersive, convincing moments, the merging of dramatic re-creations and on-camera 'performances' proves less seamlessly executed than those masterfully coordinated land, sea and air missions."

Roger Ebert of the Chicago Sun-Times gave the film two and a half out of four stars, and complained that "we don't get to know the characters as individuals, they don't have personality traits, they have no back stories, they don't speak in colorful dialogue, and after the movie you'd find yourself describing events but not people." The film was accused of having an antisemitic subtext by bloggers Debbie Schlussel and Pamela Geller as well as other Jewish sources.

Soundtrack

Relativity Media released the film's soundtrack on February 21, 2012. It includes 10 songs by country music artists. The first cut on the soundtrack, Keith Urban's "For You", was released as a single.  The song was nominated for a Golden Globe Award for Best Original Song.

See also
List of films featuring the United States Navy SEALs

References

Further reading

External links

 
 
 
 

2012 films
2010s action war films
Films set in 2010
Films set in Manila
Films set in the Philippines
American action war films
Relativity Media films
Films about terrorism
Films shot in Cambodia
Films shot in Florida
Films shot in Puerto Rico
Films shot in Mexico
Films about Mexican drug cartels
Films shot in Mississippi
Films shot in San Diego
Films about United States Navy SEALs
Camcorder films
Films shot in the Philippines
Films with screenplays by Kurt Johnstad
2012 directorial debut films
Films shot in Ukraine
Films directed by Scott Waugh
2010s English-language films
2010s American films
2010s Mexican films